is a song by Japanese pop singer Sayuri. It was released as the second single of her debut studio album, Mikazuki no Koukai, on February 24, 2016. It was used as the ending for the anime Erased.

Music video
The music video for "Sore wa Chiisana Hikari no Youna" was directed by YKBX.

Track listing

Regular edition

Limited edition type A

Limited edition type B

Limited pressing

Charts

Release history

References

Sayuri (musician) songs
2016 singles
Anime songs